Asaneth Ann Adams Kiskadden (November 9, 1848 – March 17, 1916), credited as Annie Adams, was an American actress.

Early and personal life
Adams was the daughter of Julia Ann ( Banker) and Barnabas Lothrop Adams. In 1869, she married James H. Kiskadden (died 1883), who was involved in banking and mining. Their only child, Maude Adams, became a prominent actress known for playing Peter Pan.

Career
In her early career, Adams was the leading woman of the Salt Lake City theater scene. From 1889 to 1903, Adams performed in several plays on Broadway in New York City, together with her daughter, Maude Adams, sometimes as members of Charles Frohman's stock company at the Empire Theatre.

She retired from the theatre in 1908 and returned to Salt Lake City.

References

External links

American stage actresses
1847 births
1916 deaths
Actresses from Salt Lake City